Uranobothria is a genus of butterflies in the family Lycaenidae.

Species
Uranobothria celebica (Fruhstorfer, 1917)
Uranobothria tsukadai Eliot & Kawazoé, 1983 – Tsukada's hedge blue

References

Polyommatini
Lycaenidae genera
Taxa named by Lambertus Johannes Toxopeus